The diocese of Cần Thơ is a Roman Catholic diocese of Vietnam.

The creation of the diocese in present form was declared November 24, 1960.

By 2004, the diocese of Cần Thơ had about 176,424 believers (3% of the population), 153 priests and 131 parishes.

Sacred Heart Cathedral in Cần Thơ has been assigned as the Cathedral of the diocese.

Bishops
Emmanuel Lê Phong Thuận (June 20, 1990 – October 17, 2010)
Stephen Tri Bửu Thiên (2010–present)

References

Cần Thơ
Can Tho
Christian organizations established in 1960
Roman Catholic dioceses and prelatures established in the 20th century
Can Tho, Roman Catholic Diocese of
1960 establishments in South Vietnam